HeXaeon is the sixth studio album by Norwegian death metal band Aeternus.

Even though drummer S. Winter is mentioned officially at the credits of the album, all drums were recorded by Erik Vrolok a bit before he left the band.

Track listing
 The Darkest of Minds
 Godhead Charlatan
 The 9th Revolution
 In the 3rd Dwells Oblivion
 Hexaeon
 Punished
 Ageless Void
 Christbait
 What I Crave

Personnel
 Ares - guitars, lead vocals, bass (5)
 V'gandr - bass (all but 5), backing vocals
 Erik - drums

Reception

The album was described as classic, old-school death metal with raw production. It was well received by the media and the fans, opening the way for the Bergens Metalfestival Hole In the Sky in 2006.

References

2006 albums